Fazl (also Romanized as Faz̤l) is a village in Darbqazi Rural District, in the Central District of Nishapur County, Razavi Khorasan Province, Iran. At the 2006 census, its population was 27, in 6 families.

References 

Populated places in Nishapur County